Beamish was a railway station which served the village of Beamish in County Durham, North East England, from 1894 to 1953. The station was built by the North Eastern Railway on the Beamish Deviation Line off of the earlier Stanhope and Tyne Railway.

History 
The station opened on 1 February 1894 by the North Eastern Railway. The signal box was to the south and to the east was a goods shed with four sidings and a loading bank. Passenger numbers started to decline in the 1920s when bus services were introduced. This led to the station closing on 21 September 1953. It remained open to goods until 2 August 1960. The station itself was demolished but the signal box remained until 1982.

Accident 
On 9 December 1964, twenty three coal wagons uncoupled from a shunter and ran down the line until colliding with another goods train. This resulted in one death and the line being blocked for several days. Sixty men had to work on cleaning up the debris while the trains were diverted via .

References

External links 

Disused railway stations in County Durham
Former North Eastern Railway (UK) stations
Railway stations in Great Britain opened in 1894
Railway stations in Great Britain closed in 1953
1894 establishments in England
1960 disestablishments in England